FHM (For Him Magazine) is a British multinational men's lifestyle magazine that was published in several countries. It contained features such as the FHM 100 Sexiest Women in the World, which featured models, actresses, musicians, TV presenters, and reality stars.

The final printed issue of British FHM was produced in December 2015, after which the magazine moved to a digital-only platform, with updated daily content on topics such as dating tips, style advice, viral news, sports and entertainment.

High-profile people who have been published in the magazine include top models Rosie Huntington-Whiteley, Anne Vyalitsyna, Miranda Kerr, Candice Swanepoel, Irina Shayk and Emily Ratajkowski.

History
The magazine began publication in 1985 in the UK under the name For Him Magazine and changed its title to FHM in May 1992, although the full For Him Magazine continued to be printed on the spine of each issue. The first woman to appear on the cover was Gina Davies in February 1993. The trend towards female cover stars grew over the following year, with both Naomi Campbell and Andie MacDowell appearing.

Circulation expanded to newsagents as a quarterly by the Spring of 1987 and then monthly in 1994. EMAP Consumer Media bought the magazine in 1994 and it subsequently went on to dominate the UK men's market and began to expand internationally, being published in 32 countries including India.

On 17 November 2015, British FHM announced their intention to suspend publication alongside that of fellow men's magazine ZOO, leaving the publication available via its website at FHM.com.

In August 2016, under the guidance of BauerXcel Media, a property of Bauer Media Group, Nick Dimengo took over as the senior editor of FHM.com.

FHM 100 Sexiest Women in the World

Each of FHMs international editions publish yearly rankings for the sexiest women alive based on public and editorial voting through the magazine's website. Dates of magazine issues, winners, ages of winners at the time of selection, and pertinent comments are listed below. The data below refer only to the British edition (the rankings for the international editions vary widely, with many top-ranking women in some editions not appearing at all in others).

FHM International
FHM was published in the following territories.

See also
 The Girls of FHM
 List of men's magazines

References

External links
 

1985 establishments in the United Kingdom
2016 disestablishments in the United Kingdom
Bauer Group (UK)
Defunct magazines published in the United Kingdom
Magazines established in 1985
Magazines disestablished in 2016
Men's magazines published in Canada
Men's magazines published in Indonesia
Men's magazines published in South Africa
Men's magazines published in Turkey
Men's magazines published in the United Kingdom
Monthly magazines published in the United Kingdom
Multilingual magazines
Quarterly magazines published in the United Kingdom